José Pedro Fuenzalida Gana (born 22 February 1985) is a Chilean footballer who currently plays as forward for Universidad Católica.

Club career
A product of the Universidad Católica youth set-up, Fuenzalida was promoted to the first-adult team in 2004, at the age of 19. He debuted in a 4–0 defeat with Unión Española at San Carlos de Apoquindo for a league game, during a moment considered one of the club's biggest sports crises. Similarly, Fuenzalida collated his football career with his studies in business administration at the University of the Andes, which he abandoned after a short time.

During the winter of 2007, Fuenzalida aged twenty-two decided to take a break as footballer to study commercial engineering at Pontifical Catholic University of Chile.

After six month studying, he returned to professional football and joined rivals Colo-Colo on a four-year deal. Fuenzalida debuted on 13 January 2008 against  Universidad de Concepción and scored his first goal in a 2–1 home win over Deportes Antofagasta. In June, he joined O'Higgins on loan after an unsuccessful tournament where only scored one goal in seven games.

In December 2009, it was reported that Fuenzalida finished his loan spell at O'Higgins and would return to Colo-Colo to face the next season. Seasons later, he helped the team to win the 2014 Torneo Apertura, being a key player in the title obtention which was his first honour playing for the club.

On 29 July 2014, Fuenzalida reached a one-and-half year with Argentine powerhouse Boca Juniors.

Following an unsuccessful spell at Boca, he returned to Universidad Católica in 2016, signing for Las Condes-based club as a free agent. He helped the team to win Torneo Clausura.

International career
Fuenzalida has played in the U-20 and U-23 levels of the Chile national team in the 2005 FIFA U-20 World Cup and the 2008 Toulon Tournament, respectively.

Usually called up by Marcelo Bielsa for the 2010 World Cup qualification, he was chosen by Jorge Sampaoli in Chile’s list of 23 for 2014 FIFA World Cup. In 2015, after being disaffected of the 30-man provisional list for the Copa América, he was re-considered by Sampaoli in the definitive list following the withdrawal of the injured Carlos Carmona.

Career statistics

Club

International

International goals
Scores and results list Chile's goal tally first.

Honours

Club
Universidad Católica
 Primera División de Chile (7): 2005–C, 2016–C, 2016–A, 2018, 2019, 2020, 2021
 Supercopa de Chile (4): 2016, 2019, 2020, 2021

Colo-Colo
 Primera División de Chile (1): 2014–C

Boca Juniors
 Primera División de Argentina (1): 2015
 Copa Argentina (1): 2014–15

International
Copa América (2): 2015, 2016

Individual
 Primera División's El Gráfico Golden Ball: 2013
 SIFUP Best Right Back: 2013

References

External links

 

1985 births
Living people
Footballers from Santiago
Chilean footballers
Chile international footballers
Chile under-20 international footballers
Chile youth international footballers
Chilean expatriate footballers
University of the Andes, Chile alumni
Pontifical Catholic University of Chile alumni
Club Deportivo Universidad Católica footballers
Colo-Colo footballers
O'Higgins F.C. footballers
Boca Juniors footballers
Chilean Primera División players
Argentine Primera División players
Chilean expatriate sportspeople in Argentina
Expatriate footballers in Argentina
2014 FIFA World Cup players
2015 Copa América players
Copa América Centenario players
2017 FIFA Confederations Cup players
2019 Copa América players
Copa América-winning players
Association football fullbacks
Association football wingers
People from Santiago Province, Chile